Bashiru Ally Kakurwa  Tanzanian politician, diplomat and Member of Parliament. He  was the Chief Secretary of the President of Tanzania in the 5th Cabinet, appointed by President Magufuli into office February 26, 2021. Before he was a  Secretary General of Chama Cha Mapinduzi political party in Tanzania, appointed into office on May 31, 2018. Prior to his appointment as party Secretary General, he was a lecturer at the University of Dar es Salaam.

Under President Samia Suluhu Hassan she reshuffled her cabinet and appointed Bashiru as a member of parliament on March 31, 2021.

External links

References 

Living people
Chama Cha Mapinduzi MPs
Chama Cha Mapinduzi politicians
Nominated Tanzanian MPs
University of Dar es Salaam alumni
Year of birth missing (living people)
People from Kagera Region
Tanzanian civil servants